Descent into Madness may refer to:

 "Descent into Madness", an episode of Voltron: The Third Dimension
 "Descent into Madness", a song by  Evile from the 2011 album Five Serpent's Teeth

See also
 "My Descent into Madness", a song by Eels from the 1998 album Electro-Shock Blues